Johann Christoph Sturm (3 November 1635 – 26 December 1703) was a German philosopher, professor at University of Altdorf and founder of a short-lived scientific academy known as the Collegium Curiosum, based on the model of the Florentine Accademia del Cimento. He edited two volumes of the academy's proceedings under the title Collegium Experimentale (1676 and 1685).

Sturm is the author of Physica Electiva (1697), a book that criticized Gottfried Wilhelm Leibniz and prompted him to publish a rebuke. Sturm's critique was aimed at Leibniz's view that Nature and/or its constituent parts possess some creative force of their own. This criticism was partly theological, in that Sturm claimed Leibniz's view of Nature undermined the sovereignty of the Christian God.

Works
 Collegium experimentale, Nuremberg: Endter, vol. 1 (1676), available here and here; vol. 2 (1685) available here, here, and here.
 Physica electiva sive hypothetica, vol 1, Nuremberg: Endter, 1697, available here and here; vol.2, Altdorf: Kohles, 1698.
 A list of works by Sturm with links to online versions is available at Astronomie in Nürnberg, section "Ausgewählte Werke".

References

Further reading
 Ahnert, Thomas (2002), The Culture of Experimentalism in the Holy Roman Empire: Johann Christoph Sturm (1635-1703) and the Collegium Experimentale  .
 Wiesenfeldt, Gerhard, "Speculative and Experimental Philosophy in Universities: Eclecticism ", Early Modern Experimental Philosophy, 6 December 2010.

External link

17th-century German philosophers
1635 births
1703 deaths
Academic staff of the University of Altdorf
17th-century German writers
17th-century German male writers
People from Roth (district)